Louis J. Crawford (born November 5, 1962) is a Canadian former professional ice hockey player who played 26 games in the National Hockey League between 1989 and 1992. He played with the Boston Bruins. He is the brother of Marc Crawford and Bob Crawford.

Career statistics

Regular season and playoffs

External links
 

1962 births
Living people
Adirondack Red Wings players
Boston Bruins players
Brantford Smoke players
Canadian ice hockey left wingers
Cornwall Royals players
Ice hockey people from Ontario
Kitchener Rangers players
Maine Mariners players
Milwaukee Admirals (IHL) players
Nova Scotia Oilers players
Rochester Americans players
Sportspeople from Belleville, Ontario
St. John's Maple Leafs players
Undrafted National Hockey League players
Vancouver Canucks scouts